This was the former name of two Maryland universities:

Salisbury University
Towson University